2X Software was a Maltese software company specializing in virtual desktop, application virtualization, application delivery, Remote Desktop Services, remote access and Mobile Device Management. On 25 February 2015, 2X Software was acquired by Parallels, Inc. The 2X products, Remote Application Server and Mobile Device Management, are now included in Parallels' offering.

Profile
The company has offices in the United States, Germany, UK, Australia and Malta. It develops software for the server-based computing market, in the application virtualization, remote desktop services and virtual desktop infrastructure space. With the acquisition of MDM from 3CX, the company extended its portfolio to include mobile device management.

In 2014 it was a finalist for Best of TechEd 2014, Govies Government Security Award 2014  and Datacenter ICT Application Product of the Year.

The company was acquired by Parallels, Inc. on 25 February 2015.

Products

2X Remote Application Server

2X RAS delivers virtual desktops and Windows applications hosted on hypervisors such as Microsoft Hyper-V, Citrix XenServer, VMware vSphere and others, to remote mobile or desktop devices,

2X RAS won Cloud Computing Magazine's 2012 Cloud Computing Excellence Award. 2X RAS has also won the Government Security Award 2014 and has been named to CRN's 2014 Virtualization 50 list.

The latest version of 2X RAS was released at the beginning of August 2014. The main feature updates are the management of Windows PCs as pseudo thin clients, and remote assistance.

After the acquisition by Parallels Inc., it was rebranded to Parallels RAS.

2X RDP Client
2X RDP Client provides remote desktop and application access for any web-enabled device, including Android, ChromeOS, Microsoft Windows, Linux OS, Windows Phone, MAC OS, HTML5 and iOS devices. 2X RAS delivers Microsoft Office applications to any remote or local users on the major OSs.

2X RDP Client connects to 2X RAS for Windows XP, Windows 7, Windows 8 and Windows 8.1.

2X Mobile Device Management

2X MDM was a mobile device management platform targeted at the BYOD market. It was available as a hosted (SaaS) or as an on premises solution.

References

External links
 

Software companies of Malta
Remote administration software
Remote desktop
Virtualization software